John Milliken Parker, Sr. (March 16, 1863 – May 20, 1939), was an American Democratic politician from Louisiana, who served as the state's 37th Governor from 1920 to 1924. He was a friend and admirer of U.S. President Theodore Roosevelt.

Early years
Parker was born in Bethel Church, Mississippi to John Milliken Parker and Roberta Bunchner, wealthy parents whose families each owned substantial plantation lands in that state. He was educated at the historic prep school Chamberlain-Hunt Academy in Port Gibson, Mississippi, Belle View Academy in Virginia, and Eastman Business College in Poughkeepsie, New York. A prominent businessman, he was the president of the New Orleans Cotton Exchange and the Board of Trade.

In 1891, Parker participated in the mob that lynched eleven Italian immigrants in New Orleans, avenging the murder of Police Chief David C. Hennessy. He refused to apologize for his role because he believed the mass lynching was justified.

Early political career
Parker first ran for Governor of Louisiana in 1916 as the nominee of the Progressive Party, running against state Attorney General Ruffin G. Pleasant, the Democratic nominee. Though Parker was ultimately defeated in a landslide, winning just 38% of the vote, the election was the closest gubernatorial election since 1896. Following his defeat, Parker was nominated by the Progressive party for Vice-President in 1916, but Roosevelt declined the Party's nomination for President and instead endorsed the Republican nominee, Charles Evans Hughes. Though the Party had no presidential nominee, and Parker endorsed President Woodrow Wilson for re-election, Parker remained on the ballot as the Progressive nominee for Vice-President in a handful of states, including Louisiana. Though the ticket won just 7% of the vote in Louisiana, Parker won Iberia and Lafourche parishes in southern Louisiana.

In the aftermath of both losses, Parker was seen as a likely candidate for Governor in 1920. Parker formally left the Progressive Party in 1916 and registered as a Democrat. Frank P. Stubbs, a businessman and colonel in the Louisiana National Guard, emerged as his chief opponent for the Democratic nomination. Stubbs secured the support of the Democratic Party's old guard establishment, while Parker was supported by New Orleans good government reformers, Governor Pleasant, and former Governor Jared Y. Sanders. Parker ended up narrowly defeating Stubbs in the Democratic primary, 54-45%, and won the general election with 98% of the vote.

Parker's record as governor

In 1922, he sent the Federal Bureau of Investigation a message begging for help in fighting the Ku Klux Klan, which had grown so powerful in Louisiana that it not only controlled the northern half of the state but had kidnapped, tortured, and killed two people who opposed it.

Post-gubernatorial years
After his gubernatorial term ended, Parker devoted himself to his experimental farm at Bayou Sara near St. Francisville in West Feliciana Parish. In June 1929, he was named president of the Constitutional League of Louisiana, which was organized at the St. Charles Hotel in New Orleans to "save the state from Huey Long". State Senator Norris C. Williamson of East Carroll Parish became the vice-president of the 300-member group.

Parker died in 1939 at the age of seventy-six in Pass Christian, Mississippi, east of New Orleans. He is interred at Metairie Cemetery in New Orleans.
 
The 12,000-seat John M. Parker Agricultural Coliseum on the LSU campus is named in his honor.

World War I
Roosevelt selected Parker as one of eighteen officers (others included Seth Bullock, Frederick Russell Burnham, and James Rudolph Garfield) to raise a volunteer infantry division, Roosevelt's World War I volunteers, for service in France in 1917.  The U.S. Congress gave Roosevelt the authority to raise up to four divisions similar to the Rough Riders of the 1st United States Volunteer Cavalry Regiment and to the British Army 25th (Frontiersmen) Battalion, Royal Fusiliers; however, as commander-in-chief, U.S. President Woodrow Wilson refused to make use of the volunteers, and the unit hence disbanded.

References

Sources

Notes
 Political Graveyard
 State of Louisiana – Biography

External links
 Cemetery Memorial by La-Cemeteries
 
 John M. Parker Papers at  The Historic New Orleans Collection

Democratic Party governors of Louisiana
1863 births
1939 deaths
Eastman Business College alumni
Farmers from Louisiana
Businesspeople from Louisiana
Politicians from New Orleans
American Presbyterians
People from Washington, Louisiana
People from St. Francisville, Louisiana
Louisiana Progressives (1912)
Huey Long
Burials at Metairie Cemetery